Extraterrestrial refers to any object or being beyond (extra-) the planet Earth (terrestrial). It is derived from the Latin words extra ("outside", "outwards") and terrestris ("earthly", "of or relating to the Earth"). It may be abbreviated as "E.T."

Extraterrestrial may also refer to:

General topics
 Extraterrestrial life, life that occurs outside of Earth and that probably did not originate from Earth
 Extraterrestrial intelligence, hypothetical intelligent extraterrestrial life
 Extraterrestrials in fiction
 List of alleged extraterrestrial beings

Media and entertainment
 Extraterrestrial (TV documentary), a program on the National Geographic Channel
"Extraterrestrial" (song), a 2018 song by Tynan and Kompany
 "E.T." (song), a 2010 song by Katy Perry

Film
 Extraterrestrial (2011 film), a 2011 Spanish film by Nacho Vigalondo
 Extraterrestrial (2014 film), a 2014 American film by Colin Minihan and written by The Vicious Brothers
 E.T. the Extra-Terrestrial, a 1982 film by Steven Spielberg

Other uses 
 Extraterrestrial diamonds, diamonds formed outside of Earth
 Extraterrestrial materials, objects now on Earth that were solidified prior to arriving on Earth
 Extraterrestrial sky, a view of outer space from the surface of a world other than Earth
 Extraterrestrial vortex, cyclones found on other planets or natural satellites other than the Earth

See also

 ET (disambiguation)
 Alien (disambiguation)
 Starman (disambiguation)
 Spaceman (disambiguation)
 
 Terrestrial (disambiguation)
 Extra (disambiguation)